Navilleton is an unincorporated community in Greenville Township, Floyd County, Indiana.

History
The first settlement at Navilleton was made in 1844 by a colony of German Catholics, among them Michael Naville, for whom the town was named.

A post office opened in Navilleton in 1894, and remained in operation until it was discontinued in 1902.

Geography

References

Unincorporated communities in Floyd County, Indiana
Unincorporated communities in Indiana
Louisville metropolitan area
Populated places established in 1844
1844 establishments in Indiana